The 1983 NBL season was the second season of the National Basketball League. With the relegation of Hamilton and Palmerston North to the Conference Basketball League (CBL), Wellington and Napier were promoted to the NBL for the 1983 season. Auckland won the championship in 1983 to claim their second league title.

Summary

Regular season standings

Final standings

Season awards
 Most Outstanding Guard: Kenny McFadden (Wellington)
 Most Outstanding Forward: Ben Anthony (Auckland)
 Scoring Champion: Kenny McFadden (Wellington)
 Rebounding Champion: Robbie Robinson (Napier)
 All-Star Five:
 Ben Anthony (Auckland)
 Thomas DeMarcus (Napier)
 Stan Hill (Auckland)
 Clyde Huntley (Canterbury)
 Kenny McFadden (Wellington)

References

National Basketball League (New Zealand) seasons
1983 in New Zealand basketball